

D

D